The Anglican Church of St James in Milton Clevedon, within the English county of Somerset, was rebuilt in 1790. It is a Grade II* listed building.

The first church in the village was in the 12th century. The advowson was held by Bruton Abbey until the Dissolution of the Monasteries. After this, in 1545 the church was dedicated to St James. The rebuilding in 1790 used stone from the abbey and incorporated some fabric from the medieval church. Victorian restoration occurred in the 1860s. The three stage tower is supported by diagonal buttresses and contains five bells, the oldest of which was cast in Bristol around 1380.

The parish is part of the benefice of Evercreech with Chesterblade and Milton Clevedon within the Diocese of Bath and Wells.

See also  
 List of ecclesiastical parishes in the Diocese of Bath and Wells

References

Grade II* listed buildings in Mendip District
18th-century Church of England church buildings
Grade II* listed churches in Somerset
Church of England church buildings in Somerset
Churches completed in 1790